Anzela Voronova (born 4 October 1968) is an Estonian sports shooter. She competed in the Women's 10 metre air rifle event at the 2012 Summer Olympics, finishing in 42nd place.  She also competed in the women's 50 metre rifle 3 positions competition, finishing in 31st.

References

External links
 

1968 births
Living people
Estonian female sport shooters
Olympic shooters of Estonia
Shooters at the 2012 Summer Olympics
Sportspeople from Narva
European Games competitors for Estonia
Shooters at the 2015 European Games
Estonian people of Russian descent
Shooters at the 2019 European Games